The 2013–14 Fortuna Düsseldorf season is the 119th season in the club's football history.

Review and events

Summer window activity

Mike Büskens was announced as the new head coach of Fortuna Düsseldorf on 4 June. Michael Rensing and Ben Halloran officially transferred to Fortuna Düsseldorf on 1 July. André Fomitschow returned from his loan from Energie Cottbus. Robbie Kruse was sold. Nando Rafael and Robert Almer were released Andriy Voronin and Robert Tesche were returned after their loan spells.

The draw for the first round of the DFB-Pokal happened on 15 June. Fortuna Düsseldorf was drawn against SC Wiedenbrück.

July

Fortuna Düsseldorf's season kicked off on 22 July against Energie Cottbus on matchday one of the 2. Bundesliga. Prior to the match, Michael Rensing refused to be a substitute and left the stadium with his car. Fortuna Düsseldorf won with a goal from Stefan Reisinger. Stefan Reisinger's goal was scored from a penalty kick. Fortuna Düsseldorf finished the matchday tied for fourth place in the table with 1. FC Kaiserslautern, Karlsruher SC, and FC St. Pauli. Fortuna Düsseldorf finished July against 1. FC Köln on matchday two on 28 July. The match ended in a 1–1 draw. Charlison Benschop scored for Fortuna Düsseldorf and Anthony Ujah scored for 1. FC Köln Fortuna Düsseldorf finished July in fifth place.

Michael Rensing

Prior to the match against Energie Cottbus, Michael Rensing left the stadium with his car and went home after refusing to take the substitutes bench. Robin Heller replaced Michael Rensing in the matchday squad against Energie Cottbus. He apologized to the team for the incident. Michael Rensing was promised to be starting goalkeeper. He apologized to the team for the incident. He stated that he wants to fulfill his contractg with the club. Fabian Giefer was suspended for a match after receiving a red card against Erzgebirge Aue. Michael Rensing started the next match against Karlsruher SC.

August

Fortuna Düsseldorf started August with the first round of the DFB-Pokal against SC Wiedenbrück. Wiedenbrück won 1–0 with a goal from Marwin Studtrucker. Fortuna Düsseldorf then faced 1860 München on 9 August. 1860 München won 2–1. Charlison Benschop scored for Fortuna Düsseldorf. Benjamin Lauth and Marin Tomasov scored for 1860 München. Fortuna Düsseldorf finished the matchday tied for eighth place with VfL Bochum. Then Fortuna Düsseldorf faced Union Berlin on 19 August. Union Berlin won 2–1. Axel Bellinghausen scored for Fortuna Düsseldorf and Adam Nemec scored two goals for Union Berlin. Fortuna Düsseldorf finished the matchday in 13th place. Fortuna Düsseldorf went on to face VfL Bochum on 25 August. Fortuna Düsseldorf won 1–0 with a goal from Stefan Reisinger. Fortuna Düsseldorf finished the matchday in 11th place. Fortuna Düsseldorf finished August against Arminia Bielefeld on 30 August. Arminia Bielefeld won 4–2. Johannes Rahn and Giannis Gianniotas scored for Fortuna Düsseldorf. Thomas Hübener, Fabian Klos, and Sebastian Hille scored for Arminia Bielefeld. Sebastian Hille scored two goals. Fortuna Düsseldorf finished August in 14th place.

September

Fortuna Düsseldorf started September with a 5–0 win against VfL Benrath in a friendly match. Fortuna Düsseldorf returned to Bundesliga action against Dynamo Dresden on 15 September. The match ended in a 1–1 draw. Oliver Fink scored for Fortuna Düsseldorf and Tobias Müller scored for Dynamo Dresden. Fortuna Düsseldorf finished the matchday in 15th place. Then Fortuna Düsseldorf faced FC St. Pauli on 23 September. This match also ended in a 1–1 draw. Florian Kringe scored for Fortuna Düsseldorf and Aristide Bancé scored for St. Pauli. Fortuna Düsseldorf finished the matchday in 13th place. Fortuna Düsseldorf finished September against FSV Frankfurt on 28 September. The match ended in a 0–0 draw. Fortuna Düsseldorf finished September in 15th place.

October

Fortuna Düsseldorf started October with matchday 10 against Greuther Fürth on 7 October. Fortuna Düsseldorf won 2–1. Charlison Benschop scored two goals for Fortuna Düsseldorf and Florian Trinks scored for Greuther Fürth. Fortuna Düsseldorf finished the matchday in ninth place. Fortuna Düsseldorf faced FC Ingolstadt 04 on 20 October. Fortuna Düsseldorf won 2–1. Charlison Benschop scored two goals for Fortuna Düsseldorf and Marvin Matip scored for Ingolstadt. Fortuna Düsseldorf finished the matchday in sixth place. Fortuna Düsseldorf finished October with matchday 12 against SC Paderborn 07 on 26 October. Paderborn won 6–1. Martin Latka scored for Fortuna Düsseldorf and scored an own goal for Paderborn. Mahir Sağlık and Elias Kachunga scored for Paderborn. Mahir Sağlık scored four goals. Fortuna Düsseldorf finished October in 10th place.

November

Fortuna Düsseldorf started November with matchday 13 against VfR Aalen on 1 November. Aalen won 1–0 with a goal from Robert Lechleiter. Fortuna Düsseldorf finished the matchday in 11th place. Fortuna Düsseldorf then faced SV Sandhausen on 10 November. Fortuna Düsseldorf won 1–0 with a goal from Aristide Bancé. Fortuna Düsseldorf finished the matchday in ninth place. Fortuna Düsseldorf's next opponents were Erzgebirge Aue on 24 November. Erzgebirge Aue won 3–0 with goals from Michael Fink, Zlatko Janjić, and Guido Kocer. Fortuna Düsseldorf finished the matchday in 14th place. Fortuna Düsseldorf finished November against Karlsruher SC on 29 November. Karlsruhe won 2–0 with goals from Selçuk Alibaz and Dominic Peitz. Fortuna Düsseldorf finished November in 15th place. Mike Büskens was sacked the following day. Oliver Reck was named interim head coach.

December

Oliver Reck was named interim head coach on 2 December and had his first match in charge on 9 December. Fortuna Düsseldorf started December with matchday 17 against 1. FC Kaiserslautern on 9 December. Fortuna Düsseldorf won 1–0 with a goal from Erwin Hoffer. Fortuna Düsseldorf finished the matchday in 12th place. Fortuna Düsseldorf faced Energie Cottbus Erwin Hoffer, Charlison Benschop, and Tuğrul Erat scored for Fortuna Düsseldorf and Amin Affane scored for Energie Cottbus. Fortuna Düsseldorf finished the matchday in ninth place. Fortuna Düsseldorf finished December against 1. FC Köln on 22 December. Köln won 3–2. Erwin Hoffer and Charlison Benschop scored for Fortuna Düsseldorf. Anthony Ujah and Patrick Helmes scored for Köln. Anthony Ujah scored two goals. Fortuna Düsseldorf finished December in 10th place. Lorenz-Günther Köstner became the new head coach for Fortuna Düsseldorf on 30 December.

January

Fixtures and results

Legend

2. Bundesliga

League results and fixtures

League table

DFB-Pokal

Appearances and goals

|-
! colspan="10" style="background:#dcdcdc; text-align:center"| Goalkeepers

|-
! colspan="10" style="background:#dcdcdc; text-align:center"| Defenders

|-
! colspan="10" style="background:#dcdcdc; text-align:center"| Midfielders

|-
! colspan="10" style="background:#dcdcdc; text-align:center"| Forwards

|}

Transfers

In

Out

Notes

1.Kickoff is in the Central European Time.
2.Kickoff time is sourced at here.
3.Fortuna Düsseldorf's goals listed first.

References

Fortuna Düsseldorf
Fortuna Düsseldorf seasons